Cho Jun-Ho (born 28 April 1973) is a former South Korean football player and coach. On 17th February 2022, he was announced by 
Kim Pan-Gon as Goalkeeper Coach of Malaysia National Team.

Club career
Cho made his professional debut in 1999, turning out for the Pohang Steelers.  He then transferred to Bucheon SK in 2004.  Bucheon SK subsequently relocated to Jeju Island, rebranding itself as Jeju United.  Cho played 99 games for the side.  For 2009, Cho moved to Daegu FC, where he spent 2 seasons and played just 14 games.  He retired at the end of the 2010 season, without having played a match during the season. He quit play but remained as goalkeeping coach until the 2011 season.

International career 
In January, 2006, he was selected as a squad member for the South Korea national team, but has not played at international level. He was a substitute in an exhibition game against Los Angeles Galaxy.

Club career statistics

References

External links

1973 births
Living people
Association football goalkeepers
South Korean footballers
Pohang Steelers players
Jeju United FC players
Daegu FC players
K League 1 players
FC Seoul non-playing staff